In Uganda, students receive the Uganda Advanced Certificate of Education (UACE) when they finish the 2-year upper secondary school which is also called the HSC. It is comparable to GCE A-Level in the UK. UACE is also known colloquially as "A-Level". The examinations for the UACE are administered by the Uganda National Examinations Board (UNEB).

Notable people who have qualified on this level

Yoweri Museveni
Kin Kariisa
Robert Kyagulanyi
Paul Mucureezi
Nguyo Ivana

External links
 UNEB Homepage

See also
Education in Uganda
Uganda Certificate of Education

References

School qualifications
Education in Uganda
these examinations are administered countrywide to all registered schools and students. All students are subjected to the same grading scale.